Omer Bartov (born 1954) is an Israeli-born historian. He is the Samuel Pisar Professor of Holocaust and Genocide Studies at Brown University, where he has taught since 2000. Bartov is a noted historian of the Holocaust and is considered one of the world's leading authorities on the subject of genocide. The Forward calls him "one of the foremost scholars of Jewish life in Galicia."

The son of Israel Prize-winning author Hanoch Bartov, Bartov was born in Israel and educated at Tel Aviv University and St. Antony's College, Oxford. As a historian, Bartov is most noted for his studies of the German Army in World War II. Bartov has challenged the popular view that the German Army was an apolitical force that had little involvement in war crimes or crimes against humanity in World War II. Bartov has argued that the Wehrmacht was a deeply Nazi institution that played a key role in the Holocaust in the occupied areas of the Soviet Union.

Early life and education 
Omer Bartov was born in 1954 in Ein HaHoresh, Israel. His father, Hanoch Bartov, was an author and journalist whose parents immigrated to Mandatory Palestine from Poland prior to Hanoch's birth. Bartov's mother immigrated to Mandatory Palestine from Buchach, Ukraine in the mid-1930s.

Bartov attended  in Tel Aviv and served in the Nahal. He attended Tel Aviv University, graduating with a BA in history in 1979. Bartov attended St Antony's College, Oxford for doctoral studies, graduating with a D.Phil in history in 1983.

Career 
Bartov was a Junior Fellow at the Harvard Society of Fellows from  1989 to 1992. In 1984, he was a Visiting Fellow at Princeton University's Davis Center for Historical Studies.

From 1992 to 2000, Bartov taught at Rutgers University, where he held the Raoul Wallenberg Professorship in Human Rights. At Rutgers, Bartov was also a Senior Fellow at the Rutgers Center for Historical Analysis. Bartov joined the faculty of Brown University in 2000. He was elected a member of the American Academy of Arts and Sciences in 2005.

Books
The Eastern Front, 1941–1945: German Troops and the Barbarization of Warfare, Palgrave Macmillan, 2001
Historians on the Eastern Front Andreas Hillgruber and Germany's Tragedy, pages 325–345 from Tel Aviver Jahrbuch für deutsche Geschichte, Volume 16, 1987
Hitler's Army: Soldiers, Nazis, and War in the Third Reich, Oxford Paperbacks, 1992
Hitlers Wehrmacht. Soldaten, Fanatismus und die Brutalisierung des Krieges. (German edition) .                                                                                
Murder in Our Midst: The Holocaust, Industrial Killing, and Representation, Oxford University Press, 1996
Mirrors of Destruction: War, Genocide, and Modern Identity, Oxford University Press, 2002
Germany's War and the Holocaust: Disputed Histories, Cornell University Press, 2003
The "Jew" in Cinema: From The Golem to Don't Touch My Holocaust, Indiana University Press, 2005
Erased: Vanishing Traces of Jewish Galicia in Present-Day Ukraine, Princeton University Press, 2007. Paperback 2015.
Anatomy of a Genocide: The Life and Death of a Town Called Buczacz, Simon & Schuster, 2018
The Butterfly and the Axe, Amsterdam Publishers, 2023

Awards 

 2018: National Jewish Book Award in the Holocaust category for Anatomy of a Genocide: The Life and Death of a Town Called Buczacz

Other works
Celluloid Soldiers in Russia: War, Peace and Diplomacy

Selected honors and awards
 Fellow, Center for Advanced Study in the Behavioral Sciences, Stanford, California,
 Berlin Prize Fellowship, American Academy in Berlin, Spring semester 2007
 Fellow of the American Academy of Arts and Sciences, (2005)
John Simon Guggenheim Fellowship (2003–2004)
Radcliffe Institute for Advanced Study Fellow, Harvard University (2002–2003)
National Endowment for the Humanities Fellowship for University Teachers (1996–97)
Fraenkel Prize in Contemporary History from the Institute for Contemporary History and Wiener Library, London, for the book Murder in Our Midst (1995)
 Alexander von Humboldt Fellow, Germany and France (1985–86, 1987, 1990, 1994) 
 French Government Scholarship at the FIAP Language School in Paris, France (1985) 
 Rothschild Foundation Scholarship (Rothschild Fellowship) in support of studies at Oxford University (1981–82)

References

Living people
Israeli people of Ukrainian-Jewish descent
American people of Ukrainian-Jewish descent
Brown University faculty
Harvard University staff
Fellows of the American Academy of Arts and Sciences
Historians of the Holocaust
Place of birth missing (living people)
1954 births